Volkspark Dutzendteich is a park located in Nuremberg, Germany. It hosts the annual Rock im Park festival.

References

Parks in Germany